Severe Tropical Storm Faxai, known in the Philippines as Tropical Storm Juaning, was a short-lived tropical storm that had minor effects on land. The twentieth named storm of the 2007 Pacific typhoon season, Faxai originated from a tropical depression over the open waters of the western Pacific Ocean in late October. The storm quickly strengthened, becoming a severe tropical storm on October 26 as it rapidly traveled toward the northeast. The storm became extratropical the following day as it brushed Japan. The remnants dissipated on October 28.

A Japan Airlines flight to Narita Airport encountered severe turbulence during the afternoon of October 27. One person sustained serious injuries, and five others received minor injuries; the plane was damaged during the event. One person was killed near Tokyo as the storm passed by, and three others were injured. Damages from the storm amounted to ¥150 million (US$1.5 million).

Meteorological history

Satellite imagery indicated broad cyclonic turning in the lower levels of the atmosphere, and a trough was near the surface. Convection consolidated around the center of the low-level circulation, and the upper-level environment—low wind shear and good divergence—favored development. The following day, the Japan Meteorological Agency (JMA) classified the system as a tropical depression. Shortly after, the Joint Typhoon Warning Center (JTWC) issued a Tropical Cyclone Formation Alert as convection deepened around a partially exposed low. The storm traveled northwest under the influences of a subtropical ridge to the north. At 0000 UTC on October 26, the Philippine Atmospheric, Geophysical and Astronomical Services Administration (PAGASA) designated the system as a tropical depression and gave it the local name Juaning. Around the same time, the JMA upgraded the depression to a tropical storm and gave it the name Faxai.

The JTWC issued advisories on Faxai, designating it as 20W; however, they classified it as a tropical depression. Several hours later, the storm began to undergo an extratropical transition, with convection persisting mainly in the northwestern portion of the storm and cold, dry air entering into the southwestern portion. At 1200 UTC, PAGASA issued their final advisory on Tropical Storm Juaning as it moved out of their area of responsibility. The JTWC reported that Tropical Depression 20W (Faxai) had become extratropical around this time as it merged with a baroclinic zone. A cold front developed along the southern portion of Faxai, a feature of extratropical cyclones.

The JTWC subsequently upgraded the depression to a tropical storm based on the development of a very impactful central dense overcast. A shortwave trough over the Korean peninsula provided a favorable upper-level environment for Faxai to intensify. Early the next day, Faxai began accelerating rapidly towards the northeast in the mid-latitude westerlies. An anticyclone over Japan created a strong pressure gradient between it and the tropical storm, causing the wind field of Faxai to expand significantly to the northeast. The storm continued towards the northeast at a rapid pace and became extratropical off the eastern coast of Honshu around 1200 UTC on October 27. The extratropical remnants persisted for more than a day before dissipating over open waters late on October 28. NOAA, on the other hand, continued to monitor the remnants of Faxai, with the system reaching the Aleutian Islands on October 29. The following day, the storm rapidly intensified, with the central pressure dropping to 957 hPa (mbar) by 1800 UTC. On October 31, the system tracked into Alaska and weakened.

The Japan Meteorological Agency uses 10-minute sustained winds, while the Joint Typhoon Warning Center uses one-minute sustained winds. The conversion factor between the two is 1.14. JMA's peak intensity for Faxai was 100 km/h (65 mph) 10-minute sustained, or 120 km/h (75 mph) one-minute sustained. The JTWC's peak intensity for Faxai was  one-minute sustained, or  10-minute sustained.

Preparations and impact

As Faxai approached Japan, All Nippon Airways canceled all of its day flights between Tokyo and the Izu Islands. Tokai Kisen, which operates ferries between Tokyo, the Izu Islands and Shizuoka Prefecture, canceled some services due to the storm. Residents were advised to stay indoors during the storm, especially after sunset, and to avoid possible flying debris.

Although Faxai did not make landfall, the outer bands produced heavy rains, which caused minor damage along the eastern coast of Japan. The rainfall in Miyakejima nearly surpassed the record daily rainfall for October 27. One woman was killed near Tokyo, and three people were injured. One home, two hectares of farmland,  of roads, and one ship were damaged by the storm. At the height of the storm, 9,605 residences were without power throughout Japan. Damages from cyclone totaled ¥150 million (US$1.5 million).

The turbulence caused seven injuries on the flight, as well as some damage to the plane.

See also

 2007 Pacific typhoon season
 Timeline of the 2007 Pacific typhoon season

References

External links

 JMA General Information of Severe Tropical Storm Faxai (0720) from Digital Typhoon
 JMA Best Track Data of Severe Tropical Storm Faxai (0720) 
 JMA Best Track Data (Graphics) of Severe Tropical Storm Faxai (0720)
 JMA Best Track Data (Text)
 JTWC Best Track Data of Tropical Storm 20W (Faxai)
 20W.FAXAI from the U.S. Naval Research Laboratory

2007 Pacific typhoon season
Typhoons in Japan
J
Western Pacific severe tropical storms
Tropical Storm Faxai
J
Faxai